Mariono Reksoprodjo (born 9 January 1954) is an Indonesian physician and a retired air force officer who has served as the air force surgeon general from February to May 2010 and the armed forces surgeon general from May 2010 to January 2012. Mariono specializes in obstetrics and gynaecology as well as aviation medicine.

Early life and education 
Mariono was born on 9 January 1954 as the son of R.P. Soedarsono and Mariah Soedarsono. He graduated from the Medical Faculty of the University of Indonesia in 1979. He received his license as a gynecologist in 1987 and as a aviation doctor in 2004.

Military career 
After graduating from university, Mariono applied as a military doctor and started his service at the Pattimura Airbase in Biak, Papua. Afterwards, he was transferred to Adisumarmo Airbase as a general practitioner, then to Halim Perdanakusuma Hospital as a medical officer, and then to the M. Salamun Air Force Hospital, where he became the head of the obstetrics clinic in the hospital. He moved to Jakarta after several months and became the commander of the medical task force in the air force headquarters.

Following a stint in the air force health directorate and the 1st Air Force Operations Command, Mariono was put as the head of the Saryanto Aviation and Space Health Institute, an institute that was established to check the well being of Indonesian air force aviators. After two years heading the institute, Mariono became the air force surgeon general from 25 February 2010 until 27 May 2010. During his very short tenure, Mariono became a honorary member of the Paskhas in April 2010.

Mariono served as the surgeon general of the armed forces from 9 June 2010 to 13 January 2012. He retired from the military on 29 July 2012.

Military rank

Awards

References 

1954 births
Living people